Nogometno društvo Primorje or simply ND Primorje is a Slovenian football club which plays in the town of Ajdovščina. The club was established in 2011. They competes in the Slovenian Second League, the second level of Slovenian football.

History 
The club was founded in June 2011 as Nogometno društvo Ajdovščina after the dissolution of NK Primorje, a club which folded a couple of months earlier due to high financial debt, and after failing to obtain competition licences issued by the Football Association of Slovenia. They merged their first team with ŠD Škou before the beginning of the 2012–13 season. The team gained promotion to the third level after finishing as runners-up of the 2012–13 Littoral League.

In 2016, the club was renamed as ND Primorje.

Stadium
The team play their home matches at Ajdovščina City Stadium, a 1,630 capacity stadium in Ajdovščina. The stadium was renovated during the 2009–10 season, and was reopened in September 2010.

Honours
Slovenian Third League
 Winners: 2014–15

References

External links
Official website 
Soccerway profile

Association football clubs established in 2011
Football clubs in Slovenia
2011 establishments in Slovenia